Andrea Urrutia Puente Arnao (born 31 May 1997) is a Peruvian female volleyball player. She is part of the Peru women's national volleyball team.

Career
She participated in the 2014 FIVB Volleyball World Grand Prix. On club level she played for Club Univ. San Martin De Porres in 2014. She won the Best Blocker award in the 2014 U23 Pan-American Cup.
She won the silver medal in the 2017 Bolivarian Games under 23 tournament.

Clubs
  Universidad San Martín (2013–2020)

Awards

Individuals
 2014 U23 Pan-American Cup "Best Blocker"

References

External links
 FIVB Profile

1997 births
Living people
Peruvian women's volleyball players
Place of birth missing (living people)
21st-century Peruvian women